Adrián Alberto Bianchi (born April 25, 1964) is an Argentine former footballer who has played for clubs in Argentina, Chile, Uruguay and Venezuela. He played as a forward.

Teams
 Vélez Sársfield 1987–1989
 Ferro Carril Oeste 1990–1992
 Platense 1992–1993
 Deportes Concepción 1993–1994
 Deportivo Laferrere 1994–1995
 Rampla Juniors 1996–1997
 Mineros de Guayana 1998–1999

External links
 Adrián Alberto Bianchi at BDFA 
 

1964 births
Living people
Argentine footballers
Argentine expatriate footballers
A.C.C.D. Mineros de Guayana players
Club Atlético Vélez Sarsfield footballers
Club Atlético Platense footballers
Deportivo Laferrere footballers
Deportes Concepción (Chile) footballers
Ferro Carril Oeste footballers
Rampla Juniors players
Primera B de Chile players
Chilean Primera División players
Argentine Primera División players
Expatriate footballers in Chile
Expatriate footballers in Uruguay
Expatriate footballers in Venezuela
Association football forwards